Zalán Czene (born 22 December 2002) is a Hungarian professional footballer who plays for Kisvárda II.

Career statistics
.

References

External links
 
 

2002 births
Living people
Sportspeople from Szabolcs-Szatmár-Bereg County
Hungarian footballers
Association football defenders
Kisvárda FC players
Nemzeti Bajnokság I players